The Jewell County Courthouse, at 307 N. Commercial St. in Mankato, Kansas, was built in Art Deco style in 1937.  It was listed on the National Register of Historic Places in 2002.

The architect was Joseph W. Radstinsky and the building contractor was John V. Mertz.

References

External links

Courthouses postcards site for Jewell County÷

Courthouses in Kansas
National Register of Historic Places in Jewell County, Kansas
Art Deco architecture in Kansas
Government buildings completed in 1937